Membrane protein MLC1 is a protein that in humans is encoded by the MLC1 gene.

MLC1 (also called WKL1) is the only human gene currently associated with megalencephalic leukoencephalopathy with subcortical cysts (MLC). Evidence exists for at least one other gene for MLC, but it has not been mapped or identified.

Function

The function of this gene product is not known; however, homology to other proteins suggests that it may be an integral membrane transport protein. Mutations in this gene have been associated with megalencephalic leukoencephalopathy with subcortical cysts, an autosomal recessive neurological disorder.

The MLC1 protein contains six putative transmembrane domains (S1–S6) and a pore region (P) between S5 and S6.  Furthermore, MLC1 has highest homology with the KCNA1 shaker-related voltage-gated potassium channel (Kv1.1).  This analysis suggests that MLC1 may be a cation channel.

References

Further reading

External links
  GeneReviews/NIH/NCBI/UW entry on Megalencephalic Leukoencephalopathy with Subcortical Cysts